Leptoscopus macropygus, the estuary stargazer, is a species of southern sandfish endemic to the Pacific waters around New Zealand.  It occurs at depths between a few and 60 m.  This species can reach a length of  FL.  It is currently the only known member of its genus.

References

 Tony Ayling & Geoffrey Cox, Collins Guide to the Sea Fishes of New Zealand,  (William Collins Publishers Ltd, Auckland, New Zealand 1982) 

Leptoscopidae
Endemic marine fish of New Zealand
Fish described in 1846